Gurtu is an Indian surname. Notable people with the surname include:

 Atul Gurtu (born 1946), Indian physicist
 Nilkanth Gurtu (1925–2008), Sanskrit teacher
 Shobha Gurtu (1925–2004), Indian singer
 Trilok Gurtu (born 1951), Indian percussionist and composer

Indian surnames